National Securities Depository Limited (NSDL)  is an Indian central securities depository, based in Mumbai. It was established in August 1996 as the first electronic securities depository in India with national coverage. It was established based on a suggestion by a national institution responsible for the economic development of India. It's demat accounts now hold assets worth $4 trillion.

NSDL provides services to investors, stock brokers, custodians, issuer companies, Saving account current account Business corresponding etc. through its nationwide network of Depository Participants or DPs and digital platforms.

History
Although India had a vibrant capital market which is more than a century old, the paper-based settlement of trades caused substantial problems such as bad delivery and delayed transfer of title. The promulgation of the Depositories ordinance in 1995 paved the way for the establishment of National Securities Depository Limited (NSDL), the first depository in India. Now, NSDL is one of the largest Depositories in the World. It has established a state-of-the-art infrastructure that handles most of the securities held and settled in de-materialized form in the Indian securities markets.

Securities are held in depository accounts, which are similar to holding funds in bank accounts. Transfer of ownership of securities is done through simple account transfers. This method does away with all the risks and hassles normally associated with paperwork. Consequently, the cost of transacting in a depository environment is considerably lower as compared to transacting in physical certificates.

NSDL introduced the concept of 'Demat' to India. In less than 8 years of its existence, NSDL enabled India securities markets to implement T+2 settlement. Indian markets are now implementing  T+1 settlement in phased manner.

Company structure
NSDL Group comprises National Securities Depository Limited (NSDL), NSDL Database Management Limited (NDML) and NSDL Payments Bank Limited respectively. NDML and NSDL Payments Bank are two subsidiary companies of National Security Depository Limited (abbreviated as NSDL). It provides services related to demat of securities, transfer and settlement of securities in Indian Securities Market.

Protean eGov Technologies Limited (earlier known as NSDL e-Governance Infrastructure Limited) is a separate company. It offers services related to issuance of PAN cards and also acts as central record-keeping agency for National Pension System (NPS).

NSDL Facts & Figures

NSDL has more than 2.80 Crore demat accounts as on June 30, 2022. The market share of NSDL in value of demat assets is more than 89%. NSDL demat accountholders are present in more than 99% of pin codes in India and 189 countries across the globe. It contributes to majority of the settlement in the Indian securities markets and has more than 89% share in the total value of assets held in demat form in India.

See also 
 Demat account
 Depository participant
 Central Depository Services Limited (CDSL)

References

 

Central securities depositories of India
Financial services companies based in Mumbai
Financial services companies established in 1996
Corporate social responsibility
Private sector banks in India
1996 establishments in Maharashtra
Indian companies established in 1996